Nina Bates (pronounced BAH-tes) (born May 26, 1985 in Sarajevo) is a Bosnian former competitive figure skater. She is the 2005 Bosnian and Herzegovinian national champion. She is the first single skater to represent Bosnia and Herzegovina in an ISU Championship, which she achieved at the 2003 World Junior Figure Skating Championships. 

She moved from Sarajevo to the United States at age nine because of the Bosnian War.

Programs

Competitive highlights

 WD = Withdrawn

References
 
 Bates Becomes First Skater for Bosnia-Herzegovina

1985 births
Bosnia and Herzegovina figure skaters
Sportspeople from Sarajevo
Living people
Bosnia and Herzegovina emigrants to the United States